The Asia and South Pacific Design Automation Conference, or ASP-DAC is a yearly conference on the topic of electronic design automation.  It is typically held in late January in the Far East, as the name implies.  It is sponsored by the IEEE Circuits and Systems Society (IEEE CASS), the Association for Computing Machinery (ACM)'s Special Interest Group on Design Automation SIGDA, and the Institute of Electronics Engineers of Korea (IEEK).

ASP-DAC is a combination of a trade show and a technical conference.

See also 
Design Automation Conference
International Conference on Computer-Aided Design
Design Automation and Test in Europe

References

External links 
Main web page for the ASP-DAC conference

IEEE conferences
Electronic design automation conferences